Thomai Apergi (born 23 December 1988) is a Greek singer. She made her professional debut under the label of Panik Records in 2012 with her first single "What's Your Name" (Mia Vradia). She is known for participating in Eurosong 2013 – a MAD show, the Greek national final for the Eurovision Song Contest.

Early life 
Apergi was born on 23 December 1988, in Tinos. Her first audience was her parents to whom she would give concerts every night when she was still a child. She studied music from a young age together with classical and electric guitar lessons as well as vocals, hence forming her own unique artistic personality. She attended the University of Patras. She studied Greek Literature and linguistics.

Career

2012–present: Professional debut and Eurosong 2013 
Her distinctive voice and her musical influences led her to the exploration of smooth jazz, dance bossa nova, downtempo electronica, funk, soul and jazz music, while the songs she chose to sing the past years inspire her audience with a sensational movement accompanied by a saxophone and a piano. A spicy touch in her appearances is the nights she spent singing manouche and gypsy swing, with her band Night & Day.

Apergi made an impact after releasing her first song, written by two exceptional international composers in two different versions. The English version "What's Your Name" and the Greek version titled "Mia Vradia" (One Night) were released by Panik Records and immediately attracted the interest towards this exotic, new artist. Both versions create a designated feeling for seduction and dance, with the Spanish guitar accompanying her distinctive voice with a summery note.

Her second, recently released, single is solely influenced by soul – funk influences, taking us away with its rhythm and her unique voice: "You Keep Me Rolling". A lively song with a funky character and exclusive instrumentation.

Apergi participated in Eurosong 2013 – a MAD show, the national final which selected the Greek entry for the Eurovision Song Contest 2013. Her song, "One Last Kiss", was one of the favourites to win. However she did not manage to win and came third out of four participants.

In April 2013, Apergi became a contestant in the first season of the reality show, Your Face Sounds Familiar.

She made another attempt at Eurovision in 2015. One of the favourites yet again, and presenting the only entry in Greek out of the five, she finished second behind Maria-Elena Kiriakou.

Entries in Eurosong

Discography

Albums 
 TBD (2013)

Singles

References 

Greek jazz singers
21st-century Greek women singers
English-language singers from Greece
People from Tinos
Panik Records artists
University of Patras alumni
1988 births
Living people